Illingworth may refer to:

People
Albert Illingworth, 1st Baron Illingworth (1865–1942), British businessman and politician
Alfred Illingworth (1827–1907), English worsted spinner and politician
Charlie Illingworth (1871–1926), Australian rules footballer
Charles Illingworth (1899–1991), British surgeon
Eddie Illingworth (born 1938), Australian cricketer
Edward Illingworth (1896–1924), English cricketer
Francisco Illingworth (1905–1982), Vice President of Ecuador
Frederick Illingworth (1844–1908), Australian politician
George Illingworth (1877–1950), Australian politician
Illingworth Kerr (1905–1989), Canadian landscape painter
James Illingworth (born ?), British Army officer
Jeremy Illingworth (born 1977), English footballer
Jim Illingworth (1901–1967), Australian rules footballer
John Illingworth (yacht designer) (1903–1980), British naval architect
John Illingworth (footballer) (1904–1964), English footballer
John Lister Illingworth Fennell (1918–1992), British historian
J. R. Illingworth (1848–1915), British Anglican priest and academic
Julian Illingworth (born 1984), American professional squash player
Leslie Gilbert Illingworth (1902–1979) British cartoonist
Max Illingworth (born 1992), Australian Chess Grandmaster
Nelson Illingworth (1862–1926), English sculptor
Nigel Illingworth (born 1960), English cricketer
Percy Illingworth (1869–1915), British politician
Philip Illingworth (born 1948), Canadian judoka
Ray Illingworth (1932–2021), English cricketer
Richard Illingworth (born 1967), English cricketer and umpire
Ronald Illingworth (1909–1990), British paediatrician
Sarah Illingworth (born 1963), New Zealand cricketer
Simon Illingworth (born 1967), Australian anti-corruption spokesman
William Illingworth (archivist) (1764–1845), English lawyer and archivist
William H. Illingworth (1844–1893), English photographer
Fictional 
Lord Illingworth, a fictional character from the 1893 play A Woman of No Importance by Oscar Wilde

Places
Firebase Illingworth, a former United States Army firebase in southwestern Vietnam
Illingworth, Alberta, a locality in Canada
Illingworth, West Yorkshire, England, a suburb of Halifax